Minuscule 91 (in the Gregory-Aland numbering), O14 (Soden), formerly known as Codex Perronianus 10, is a Greek minuscule manuscript of the New Testament, on parchment leaves. Palaeographically it has been assigned to the 11th century. Formerly it was dated to the 10th century (Scrivener, Gregory). Formerly it was labelled by 12a, 16p and 4r. It has marginalia.

Description 

The codex contains the text of the four Acts, Catholic epistles, Paul, Rev., with some lacunae, on 313 parchment leaves. The text is written in one column per page, 40 lines per page.

The text is divided according to the κεφάλαια (chapters), whose numbers are given at the margin, and the τίτλοι (titles of chapters) at the top of the pages. 

It contains Prolegomena, tables of the κεφάλαια (tables of contents) before each book, Synaxarion, Menologion. It contains a few commentaries. The commentary on the Acts and Epistles is that of the pseudo-Oecumenius; that on the Book of Revelation is that of Arethas of Caesarea.

Hebrews is placed before 1 Timothy. 

Kurt Aland the Greek text of the codex did not place in any Category.

History 

The manuscript belonged to the Medicis. Janus Lascaris presented it in 1518 to Pietro Merieli. Donatus of Verona in 1532 used it for the first edition of works of Oecumenius.

It once belonged to the "S. Taurini monasterium Ebriocense", then to Cardinal Perron's († 1618). 

Bernard de Montfaucon sent John Mill extracts of this codex.

It was examined by Wettstein, Griesbach, Scholz, Grafton for Alford, and Paulin Martin. C. R. Gregory saw the manuscript in 1885. 

Formerly it was labelled by 12a, 16p and 4r. In 1908 Gregory gave number 91 for it.

It is currently housed in at the Bibliothèque nationale de France (Gr. 219), at Paris.

See also 

 List of New Testament minuscules
 Biblical manuscript
 Textual criticism

References

Further reading 

 Jean-Pierre-Paul Martin, Description technique des manuscrits grecs relatifs au Nouveau Testament, conservés dans les bibliothèques de Paris (Paris 1883), p. 109

External links 

 Minuscule 91 at the Encyclopedia of Textual Criticism 

Greek New Testament minuscules
11th-century biblical manuscripts
Bibliothèque nationale de France collections